Aptos (Ohlone for "The People") is an unincorporated town in Santa Cruz County, California. The town is made up of several small villages, which together form Aptos: Aptos Hills-Larkin Valley, Aptos Village, Cabrillo, Seacliff, Rio del Mar, and Seascape. Together, they have a combined population of 24,402.

History 

Aptos was traditionally inhabited by the Awaswas tribe of Ohlone people. The name is one of only three native words that have survived (in Hispanicized form) as place names in Santa Cruz County (the others are Soquel and Zayante).

The first European land exploration of Alta California, the Spanish Portolá expedition, passed through the area on its way north, camping at one of the creeks on October 16, 1769. The expedition diaries don't provide enough information to be sure which creek it was, but the direction of travel was northwest, parallel to the coast. Franciscan missionary Juan Crespi, traveling with the expedition, noted in his diary that, "We stopped on the bank of a small stream, which has about four varas of deep running water. It has on its banks a good growth of cottonwoods and alders; on account of the depth at which it runs it may be that it cannot be utilized to water some plains through which it runs." Crespi diary translator Herbert Bolton speculated that the location was Soquel Creek, but it could have been Aptos Creek.

In 1833 the government of Mexico granted Rafael Castro the  Rancho Aptos. Initially Castro raised cattle for their hides, but after California became a state in 1850, Castro leased his land to Americans who built a wharf, general store, and lumber mill. The original town was located where Aptos Village Square is now. In 1853 a leather tannery was built, and the main building is a bed & breakfast inn.

In 1878 Augustia Castro, daughter of Rafael Castro, and her husband José Arano built the Victorian, Bayview Hotel in Aptos village. The hotel is a Santa Cruz County landmark. It is Santa Cruz county's oldest operating hotel. It has been a State Historic Monument since 1974 and listed on the National Register of Historic Places since 1993. Since being originally built, the hotel was moved to its current location.

In the mid to late 1800s, a series of major epidemics hit the area. A particularly bad one occurred in the early winter of 1868. Cases of smallpox were reported among the poor of San Juan Bautista. Efforts were made to localize the rapidly spreading disease, such as, barricading the roads leading in and out of San Juan Bautista. These efforts failed however, and when cases appeared in Watsonville, Santa Cruz citizens attempted to again quarantine the disease by destroying the Aptos Bridge. These efforts again failed and only created a rift between the two cities. The death toll of the smallpox epidemic lead to the local press publishing of the latest remedies available for home use as well as methods to prevent the spread of smallpox and inoculations.

By 1872, Claus Spreckels, a sugar millionaire, began buying the land from Castro. He built a hotel near the beach and a summer mansion and ranch with a racetrack for his horses. A large area was fenced and stocked with deer for hunting, and became known as "the Deer Park," home of today's Deer Park Center. With the coming of the railroad, the town moved to the other side of Aptos Creek.

From 1880 to 1920 redwood timber harvesting became the major industry, and Aptos became a boom town. The Loma Prieta Lumber Company logged all of what is now The Forest of Nisene Marks State Park. The Valencia Mill logged everything to the east. Within 40 years the hills were bare, and apples became the next industry. The Hihn Apple Barn is a historic building from that era; in 2016-2017, the building had been relocated nearby to be used as a grocery store and make way for a shopping complex.

On March 16–20, 1905, the Leonard Ranch near La Selva was the site of experiments with a new tandem-wing glider designed and built by John J. Montgomery. Hoisted aloft by hot-air balloon to considerable heights, over a series of test flights pilot Daniel J. Maloney was able to demonstrate the control and flight of the Montgomery glider design. These flights, with starting altitudes over 3,000 feet above the ground, were the first high-altitude flights in the world. A marker was placed at this location in 2005 honoring the centennial of these accomplishments.

After Spreckels' death, Seacliff Park and Rio Del Mar Country Club (today's Seacliff State Beach) were developed in the late 1920s. Rio Del Mar Country Club included a clubhouse, a grand hotel on the bluffs, a beach club, a polo field, and a golf course. The estuary was filled in (now Rio Beach Flats) and the SS Palo Alto cement ship was moored and converted into an amusement pier with restaurants, swimming pool, and a dance pavilion. Both Rio Del Mar and Seacliff were popular during Prohibition as drinking and gambling were discreetly available. These amusements were interrupted by the Great Depression and World War II.

In the early 1960s Aptos began a period of rapid development, including Cabrillo College, Rancho Del Mar Shopping Center, the Seascape Resort development, and many residential developments.

Geography 

Aptos is located at  (36.981500, -121.907432).

For statistical purposes, the United States Census Bureau has defined Aptos as a census-designated place (CDP). The census definition of the area is limited in contrast to the local understanding of the area with the same name. The population of the CDP was 6,220 at the 2010 census. The southwestern geographical boundary is Monterey Bay, while the northeast boundary is the Santa Cruz Mountains.

Aptos is bisected northwest-to-southeast by the State Route 1 freeway and includes the ZIP codes 95001 and 95003.

Demographics

2010 

The 2010 United States Census reported that Aptos had a population of 6,220. The racial makeup of Aptos was 5,420 (87.1%) White, 58 (0.9%) African American, 43 (0.7%) Native American, 247 (4.0%) Asian, 8 (0.1%) Pacific Islander, 175 (2.8%) from other races, and 269 (4.3%) from two or more races. Hispanic or Latino of any race were 611 persons (9.8%).

The census reported that 98.7% of the population lived in households and 1.3% lived in non-institutionalized group quarters.

There were 2,549 households, out of which 686 (26.9%) had children under the age of 18 living, 1,353 (53.1%) were married couples living together, 192 (7.5%) had a female householder with no husband present, 95 (3.7%) had a male householder with no wife present. There were 142 (5.6%) unmarried. 665 households (26.1%) were made up of individuals, and 268 (10.5%) had someone living alone who was 65 years of age or older. The average household size was 2.41. There were 1,640 families (64.3% of all households); the average family size was 2.86.

The population was spread out, with 1,150 people (18.5%) under the age of 18, 436 people (7.0%) aged 18 to 24, 1,342 people (21.6%) aged 25 to 44, 2,189 people (35.2%) aged 45 to 64, and 1,103 people (17.7%) who were 65 years of age or older. The median age was 46.9 years. For every 100 females, there were 97.8 males. For every 100 females age 18 and over, there were 96.8 males.

The homeowner vacancy rate was 1.5%; the rental vacancy rate was 0.8%. 75.2% of the population lived in owner-occupied housing units and 23.5% lived in rental housing units.

2000 

As of the census of 2000, there were 9,396 people, 4,055 households, and 2,428 families residing in the CDP. The racial makeup of the CDP was 90.38% White, 0.56% African American, 0.65% Native American, 2.39% Asian, 0.11% Pacific Islander, 2.49% from other races, and 3.42% from two or more races. Hispanic or Latino of any race were 6.97% of the population.

There were 4,055 households, out of which 25.8% had children under the age of 18 living with them, 48.1% were married couples living together, 8.1% had a female householder with no husband present, and 40.1% were non-families. 27.5% of all households were made up of individuals, and 8.2% had someone living alone who was 65 years of age or older. The average household size was 2.29 and the average family size was 2.78.

In the CDP, the population was spread out, with 19.3% under the age of 18, 6.5% from 18 to 24, 30.9% from 25 to 44, 29.4% from 45 to 64, and 14.0% who were 65 years of age or older. The median age was 41 years. For every 100 females, there were 94.7 males. For every 100 females age 18 and over, there were 92.0 males.

The median income for a household in the CDP was $61,843, and the median income for a family was $73,515. Males had a median income of $51,848 versus $40,050 for females. The per capita income for the CDP was $33,210. About 2.5% of families and 7.1% of the population were below the poverty line, including 3.4% of those under age 18 and 6.2% of those age 65 or over.

Government 

Parks and recreation 

Aptos is home to both the Forest of Nisene Marks State Park and Seacliff State Beach California state parks. Nisene Marks is popular with hikers and mountain bikers. The San Andreas Fault Zone passes nearby and the epicenter of the M6.9 1989 Loma Prieta earthquake lies within.

Aptos is also home to the annual Fourth of July "World's Shortest Parade," so called because the parade route is about .6 miles (1 km) long.

Aptos Park is the site of the annual Aptos Blues Festival. Several well-known performers have performed at the festival, B.B. King, Buddy Guy, John Lee Hooker, Ray Charles, Leon Russell, Los Lobos, Gregg Allman, the Doobie Brothers, Bonnie Raitt, and Al Green.

Education 

Cabrillo College is a two-year community college in Aptos.

Aptos has three public elementary schools: Valencia Elementary, Rio Del Mar Elementary, and Mar Vista Elementary. It also has one junior high school, Aptos Junior High School, and one high school, Aptos High School. Private schools include Santa Cruz Montessori School, Orchard School, and Twin Lakes Christian School. Aptos Academy, a pre-school through eighth grade private school, closed in 2013.

Sports 

In 1983 the Aptos High Mariners varsity girls basketball team, coached by Dan Gruber, won the school's first CCS Team Championship.  The Aptos High Mariners varsity boys basketball team reached the state finals in the spring of 1986 and the NorCal Championship in the spring of 1987.  The Aptos High Mariners boys soccer team was nationally ranked and advanced to the California Interscholastic Federation - Central Coast Section (CCS) Division 1 finals.  The Aptos girls soccer accomplished the same that year and advanced to the CCS Division 1 finals.  The Aptos High Mariners football team won the 2003 CCS Div II title,  its first football CCS title.  The High School's winningest team, however, is the Aptos track and field team.  The girls team has won the past twelve league championships,  and the boys team has won eleven of the last twelve.  The varsity cheer leading team also took home 2 State Championship trophies in the 90's  and another one in 2010 as the varsity anchors. 

The Aptos Little League baseball team made it to the Little League World Series in 2002, and was the subject of a documentary film on PBS, Small Ball: A Little League Story.

In 2005 the Aptos High girls and boys cross country team won the CCS championship  and the boys finished third at state championships  while the girls were crowned state champions.

In 2007, the Aptos High boys' cross-country team won CCS, and took third in state. The girls' team took second in CCS.

In 2007, the baseball team at Aptos High was nationally ranked and advanced to the CCS D2 finals losing out by a single home run.  Team is coached by ex-MLB Pitcher and Head Coach Randall Kramer, ex-MLB World Series Pitcher Mark Eichhorn, and ex-MLB Scout Matt King.  Between these three coaches there are four World Series rings. 

In 2008, the boys' cross-country team won CCS for the second year in a row and took fifth at state.  The girls' team was second at CCS and eighth in state.

Notable people 

 Frank Drake - SETI Founder, prominent Astronomer, Drake Equation.  
 Trent Dilfer, National Football League quarterback, attended Aptos High School, class of 1990
 Nikki Hiltz, professional Runner, attended Aptos Middle School
 Dave Draper, body builder, actor, motivational speaker, and author
 Mark Eichhorn, Major League Baseball pitcher
 Randy Kramer, Major League Baseball pitcher, Professional baseball scout Toronto Blue Jays.
 Lou Harrison, composer
 Daniel Henry Holmes Ingalls, Jr., computer scientist
 Harry Hooper, Major League Baseball player and member of the Hall of Fame, lived in Capitola, California and is buried in Aptos. Harry Hooper was one of two players traded by the Boston Red Sox, along with Babe Ruth, that created the Curse of the Bambino.
 Edmund Kemper, also known as the Co-ed Butcher or the Co-ed Killer, an American serial killer, necrophile, and cannibal
 Marisa Miller, model
 Bill Miller, Major League Baseball umpire
 John J. Montgomery, aviation pioneer
 Thomas Pynchon, author
 George Windle Read, Jr., United States Army Lieutenant General

See also 

 Seascape Beach Resort

References

External links 

 Aptos History Museum
 Aptos Community Site
 Aptos Community News and Information
 Aptos Chamber of Commerce
 Santa Cruz County Conference & Visitors Council - Aptos Visitor Information

 
Census-designated places in Santa Cruz County, California
Populated coastal places in California
Census-designated places in California